Paradise is a Spanish speculative fiction television series with mystery and adventure elements set in 1992. Produced by Movistar+ and Globomedia (The Mediapro Studio), it is directed by Fernando González Molina. It premiered on 4 June 2021.

Premise 
The fiction is set in the Spanish Levante in the 1990s. The plot concerns the disappearance of 3 girls—Sandra, Elena and Malena—in 1992 in the fictional Valencian coastal town of "Almanzora de la Vega". As the policial investigation is seemingly going nowhere, Sandra's younger brother, Javi, starts another search together with Quino, Álvaro and Zeta.

Cast 
 Macarena García as Paula Costa, a Civil Guard agent investigating the case of three missing girls in the Mediterranean coast.
  as Mario, the father of one of the missing girls.
 Gorka Otxoa as Morte, Zeta's father.
 Pau Gimeno as Javi.
 Cristian López as Álvaro.
 León Martínez as Quino.
 Héctor Gozalvo as Zeta.
  as Bea.
 Patricia Iserte as Olivia.
Introduced in season 2
  as Mateo.
 Begoña Vargas as Evelyn.
  as Valentina.
 Carla Domínguez as Anabel.

Production 

Created by Fernando Gonzalez Molina, Ruth García and David Oliva, cited inspirations included the works of Steven Spielberg and series such as V, Verano azul and Compañeros, although it was already likened to Stranger Things soon after the announcement of the project. Fernando González Molina directed the series whereas Antón Laguna was charged with the art direction. Lucas Vidal composed the musical score. It also features songs by OBK and Mecano. The series' main theme was performed by Ana Torroja.

Filming started by January 2020, taking place in several places in Spain. Additional footage was shot in other locations such as Alhama de Aragón (Zaragoza), municipalities in the Valencia province and the Madrid region, and the Centro Nacional del Vidrio in La Granja (Segovia). Filming wrapped in August 2020. On 20 April 2021, Movistar+ announced the intended premiere date of 4 June 2021.

In June 2021, The Mediapro Studio reported that the production crew had begun filming of season 2 on 17 May 2021 in Begur (Girona), with Fernando González Molina returning as director. Season 2 was presented by a group of cast and crew members at the 54th Sitges Film Festival on 12 October 2021. In October 2021, WarnerMedia announced the addition of the series (titled Paradise) to their catalogue as "Max Original" with a release date on HBO Max set for 28 October 2021.

Movistar Plus+ scheduled the release of the second and final season of the series for 16 June 2022.

References 
Notes

Citations

External links 
 

2020s science fiction television series
2021 Spanish television series debuts
2020s Spanish drama television series
Spanish fantasy television series
Television series set in 1992
Television shows set in the Valencian Community
Television shows filmed in Spain
Spanish science fiction television series
Spanish-language television shows
Movistar+ original programming
Television series by Globomedia